Wrestling Dontaku 2010 was a professional wrestling pay-per-view (PPV) event promoted by New Japan Pro-Wrestling (NJPW). The event took place on May 3, 2010, in Fukuoka, Fukuoka, at the Fukuoka Kokusai Center. The event featured nine matches (including one dark match), four of which were contested for championships. It was the seventh event under the Wrestling Dontaku name.

Storylines
Wrestling Dontaku 2010 featured nine professional wrestling matches that involved different wrestlers from pre-existing scripted feuds and storylines. Wrestlers portrayed villains, heroes, or less distinguishable characters in the scripted events that built tension and culminated in a wrestling match or series of matches.

Event
In the third match, NJPW veteran Jyushin Thunder Liger defeated Consejo Mundial de Lucha Libre (CMLL) representative Negro Casas to win the CMLL World Middleweight Championship. The event also featured the continuation of a three-way tag team rivalry between Bad Intentions (Giant Bernard and Karl Anderson), No Limit (Tetsuya Naito and Yujiro Takahashi) and Seigigun (Wataru Inoue and Yuji Nagata), with Seigigun capturing the IWGP Tag Team Championship from No Limit. Pro Wrestling Noah's Naomichi Marufuji successfully defended his IWGP Junior Heavyweight Championship against Ryusuke Taguchi during the event. In the main event, Togi Makabe, a decade after his first Wrestling Dontaku appearance, defeated Shinsuke Nakamura to win the IWGP Heavyweight Championship for the first time.

Results

References

External links
The official New Japan Pro-Wrestling website

2010
2010 in professional wrestling
May 2010 events in Japan